Posht Chenar (also Romanized as Posht Chenār; also known as Posht Chendār and Posht-e Chendār) is a village in Sarfaryab Rural District, Sarfaryab District, Charam County, Kohgiluyeh and Boyer-Ahmad Province, Iran. At the 2006 census, its population was 132, in 23 families.

References 

Populated places in Charam County